The Jefferson County, Florida paleontological sites are assemblages of Mid-Miocene to Late Pleistocene vertebrates from Jefferson County, Florida, United States.

Age
Era: Neogene
Period: Miocene to Pleistocene, ~23.03 Mya—11,000 years ago. (calculates to a period of approximately ). 
Faunal stage: Clarendonian through early Rancholabrean

Sites
Ashville site (Miocene) Time period: ~13.5—12.7 Mya.
Aucilla River site (Pleistocene) Time period: ~126,000—11,000 years ago. The Aucilla site specimens were discovered by amateur paleontologist Dr. Richard Ohmes of Bremerton, Washington in 1969.
Coordinates: 
Wacissa River site (Pleistocene) Time period: ~126,000—11,000 years ago. Collected by R. Alexon, B. Mathen, R. Gingery in October 1981; in shallow water. Specimens reposited in the Florida Museum of Natural History.
Coordinates: 
	  
Ashland site = ASH. Aucilla River site = ARS. Wacissa River site = WRS.

Reptiles
Emydidae (turtle) WRS
Geochelone (tortoise) ARS
Alligator WRS

Birds
Grus americana (whooping crane) ARS

Mammals
Artiodactyla (deer-like) ASH, ARS
Bison antiquus (bison) WRS
Calippus proplacidus ASH
Camelops (camel) ARS
Equus (horse) ARS, WRS
Hemiauchenia (camel) WRS
Hippotherium (horse) ASH
Megalonyx (ground sloth) ARS
Mammut (American mastodon) ARS
Menoceratinae (rhinoceros)
Tapirus (tapir) ARS
Odocoileus virginianus (deer-like) WRS
Palaeolama (llama) WRS

References

Texas A&M Univdersity
Webb, S.D. 2000. Two cycles of Late Pleistocene sinkhole filling in the middle Aucilla River, Jefferson County, Florida, pp. 142–153, in W. Schmidt, J. Lloyd, and C. Collier (eds), The Wakulla Springs- Woodville Karst Plain Symposium, Florida Geological Survey Special Publication No. 46.

Paleontological sites of Florida
Geography of Jefferson County, Florida